Seán Brett (born 1967) is an Irish retired Gaelic footballer who played as a left corner-forward for the Tipperary senior team.

Born in Mullinahone, County Tipperary, Brett first arrived on the inter-county scene at the age of sixteen when he first linked up with the Tipperary minor team before later joining the under-21 and junior sides. Brett joined the senior panel during the 1989 championship.

At club level Brett played with Mullinahone.

He retired from inter-county football following the conclusion of the 1996 championship.

Honours

Player

Tipperary
McGrath Cup (2): 1989, 1993
Munster Junior Hurling Championship (1): 1990
Munster Minor Football Championship (1): 1984

References

1967 births
Living people
Mullinahone Gaelic footballers
Mullinahone hurlers
Tipperary inter-county hurlers
Tipperary inter-county Gaelic footballers